1600 Daily was an online newsletter started in March 2017. It was a part of the whitehouse.gov website and posted stories daily as well as sending emails with news to anyone who signs up. The news focused on what is happening in the White House. Other tidbits like the president's schedule and upcoming dates were included.

History
1600 Daily was launched by the Trump administration in March 2017.  The idea was for an email newsletter that anyone could sign up for via the White House website. Also called the West Wing Report, the newsletter would come in an email and include: a photo of the day, an article about the President (or sometimes Vice President), and the schedule for the President's day. Although the intention was for it to be an "email newsletter, meant to be read in the inbox," anyone could view the newsletter by visiting the website.

1600 Daily was discontinued under the new Biden administration, and the original link redirects to the Whitehouse Press Briefing.

References

Newsletters
Newspapers established in 2017
Publications of the United States government